Bangiomorpha pubescens is a red alga.
It is the first known sexually reproducing organism.
This fossil of a type of red algae is the oldest example of an organism belonging to an extant phylum. The fossil includes differentiated reproductive cells that are the oldest evidence of sexual reproduction. Sexual reproduction increased genetic variation, which led to an increased rate of evolution and the diversification of eukaryotes.

References

Bangiophyceae
Red algae genera
Fossil taxa described in 2000
Monotypic algae genera